Patrick McLoughlin (born 1957) is a British politician.

Patrick McLoughlin may also refer to:
 Patrick McLoughlin (set decorator)
 Patrick McLoughlin (editor) (1835–1882), newspaper editor of the Cape Colony